Fier can refer to:

Places
 Fier County, one of 12 counties of Albania
 Fier District, one of 36 districts in Albania, within the above county
 Fier, a city in that district
 Fier (river) in eastern France

People
 Alexandr Fier, a Brazilian chess grandmaster
 Anton Fier, an American musician